Toshiba Pasopia is a computer from manufacturer Toshiba, released in 1981 and based around a Zilog Z80 microprocessor. This is not to be confused with the Toshiba Pasopia IQ, a similar named line of MSX compatible computers.

There are two models, the PA7010 and the PA7012. PA7010 comes with T-BASIC, a version of Microsoft BASIC. PA7012 comes with the more powerful built-in operating system - OA-BASIC developed by Toshiba, capable of sequential file access and automated loading of programs.
The keyboard has 90 keys, a separate numeric keypad and eight function keys. The machine could be expanded with disk drives, extra RAM and offered a RS-232 and a parallel printer port.

In 1982 the machine was sold on the American market as Toshiba T100. It had an optional LCD screen (with 320 x 64  resolution) that fitted into the keyboard. Two CRT monitors were available: a 13" green monochrome, and 15" RGB color.
1982 models came with T-BASIC version 1.1.

The machine supported cartridge-type peripherals called PAC, RAM packs with battery backup, Kanji ROM packs and joystick ports. Pascal and OA-BASIC cartridges were on sale.

In 1983 Toshiba released the Toshiba Pasopia 7 and in 1984 the Toshiba Pasopia 5,  intended as successors to the Pasopia 7010.

See also 
 Toshiba Pasopia IQ
 Toshiba Pasopia 5
 Toshiba Pasopia 7
 Toshiba Pasopia 16

References 

Pasopia
Z80-based home computers
Computer-related introductions in 1981